Robert Francis Lyne (2 April 1885 – 13 April 1957) was a Welsh field hockey player, born in Newport, who competed in the 1908 Summer Olympics. In 1908 he won the bronze medal as member of the team Wales.

References

External links
 
Robert Lyne's profile at Sports Reference.com

1885 births
1957 deaths
Sportspeople from Newport, Wales
Welsh male field hockey players
Olympic field hockey players of Great Britain
British male field hockey players
Field hockey players at the 1908 Summer Olympics
Olympic bronze medallists for Great Britain
Welsh Olympic medallists
Medalists at the 1908 Summer Olympics